Hilda Lovisa Nordquist (6 April 1881–16 October 1935) was a Swedish missionary. She served with the Mission Union of Sweden in Chinese Turkestan (present day Xinjiang).

Bibliography
J. Lundahl (editor), På obanade stigar: Tjugofem år i Ost-Turkestan  (Stockholm, Svenska Missionsförbundet Förlag, 1917) Swedish

External links
Mission and Change in Eastern Turkestan (English Translation of select chapters of Mission och revolution i Centralasien)

1881 births
1935 deaths
Swedish Protestant missionaries
Protestant missionaries in China
Christian missionaries in Central Asia
Female Christian missionaries
Swedish expatriates in China